Vyacheslav Yuryevich Lotoryov (born 23 June 1975) is a former Russian football player. In 1992, he debuted for FC Shinnik Yaroslavl.

References

1975 births
Living people
Russian footballers
FC Shinnik Yaroslavl players
Russian Premier League players
FC Sheksna Cherepovets players
Association football midfielders
FC Baltika Kaliningrad players